Lasjerd (also Romanized as Lāsjerd, Lāsgerd, Lāsgird, and Lāsjird) is a village in Lasgerd Rural District, in the Central District of Sorkheh County, Semnan Province, Iran. At the 2006 census, its population was 1,069, in 318 families.

References 

Populated places in Sorkheh County